Hyloxalus mystax is a species of frog in the family Dendrobatidae. It is endemic to Ecuador where it is only known from its type locality on the Cordillera del Cóndor at  asl. It is a little known species not observed since 1972.

Description
Males measure  and females  in snout–vent length. They have scattered dark
spots on the abdomen. Males have pronounced black stippling on the throat. The male call is a rapid series of chirps.

Habitat and conservation
The species' natural habitats are cool montane cloud forests. It was fairly common when the type series was collected in 1972; it has not been observed afterwards (there has not been sufficient search effort either). Threats to this species are unknown.

References

mystax
Amphibians of Ecuador
Endemic fauna of Ecuador
Amphibians described in 1988
Taxonomy articles created by Polbot